Sociological Forum is a quarterly peer-reviewed academic journal published by Wiley on behalf of the Eastern Sociological Society. The journal was established in 1986 with Robin M. Williams Jr as founding editor-in-chief. Subsequent editors were Steven Cole, Richard Hall, Robert Max Jackson and presently, Karen A. Cerulo.

According to the Journal Citation Reports, the journal has a two-year impact factor of 1.907.

References

External links 
 

Wiley (publisher) academic journals
English-language journals
Publications established in 1986
Quarterly journals
Sociology journals